The 1985 PBA Reinforced Conference Finals was the best-of-7 basketball championship series of the 1985 PBA Reinforced Conference, and the conclusion of the conference playoffs. The Northern Cement basketball team and Manila Beer Brewmasters played for the 32nd championship contested by the league.

Northern (NCC) scored the first ever 4–0 sweep in a best-of-seven championship series against Manila Beer and became the second guest squad to win a PBA title.

Qualification

Series scoring summary

Games summary

Game 1

NCC blew the game wide open in the third period on Jeff Moore's perimeter shooting, hitting from all angles as he mocked every defense thrown at him by the Brewmasters. Northern took a commanding 26-point lead going into the final quarter as Moore continued his shooting spree in the fourth period where NCC got their biggest lead of 40 points at 121–81.

Game 2

From a 56-all deadlock at halftime, the Brewmasters opened the third period with a 13–0 run to take a 69–56 lead. The Nationals bounced back and even grabbed the upper hand at the end of the third quarter at 91–87. In the final period, NCC pulled away and got their biggest lead at 120–97. Four NCC players scored more than 20 points in the game.

Game 3

NCC led by 10 points after three quarters, 79–69. The Nationals began piling up points in the fourth period and pulled away, 106–86, with four minutes to go.

Game 4

Similar to the series opener, Northern put on a show in a big third quarter explosion with Jeff Moore, Samboy Lim, Hector Calma and Dennis Still all scoring at will and the team shooting at a high field goal. NCC was up by 28 points, 99–71, entering the final quarter. The Brewmasters were totally outclass as coach Ron Jacobs pulled out his starters with about six minutes remaining and the second stringers, particularly Alfie Almario, was still nailing three-pointers to stretch their lead to 38 points at 125–87.

Rosters

Broadcast notes

References

Manila Beer Brewmasters games
Philippines men's national basketball team games
1985
1985 PBA season
PBA Reinforced Conference Finals